St Mawgan and Colan was an electoral division of Cornwall in the United Kingdom which returned one member to sit on Cornwall Council from 2013 to 2021. It was abolished at the 2021 local elections, being succeeded by St Columb Minor and Colan and St Columb Major, St Mawgan and St Wenn.

Councillors

Extent
St Mawgan and Colan covered the villages of Quintrell Downs, St Mawgan, Colan and the hamlets of Mountjoy, Chapel, Trebarber, Tregurrian, Mawgan Porth. The division covered 4,835 hectares in total.

Election results

2017 election

2013 election

Notes

References

Electoral divisions of Cornwall Council